Pukeiti is one of the volcanoes in the Auckland volcanic field. The crater rim was quarried on the south and east side. Extensive lava poured out from this vent to form a lava flow field to the north and east. It is now part of the Otuataua Stonefields reserve.

The New Zealand Ministry for Culture and Heritage gives a translation of "cabbage tree hill" for Pukeitī.

References

City of Volcanoes: A geology of Auckland - Searle, Ernest J.; revised by Mayhill, R.D.; Longman Paul, 1981. First published 1964. .
Volcanoes of Auckland: The Essential Guide. Hayward, B.W., Murdoch, G., Maitland, G.; Auckland University Press, 2011.
Volcanoes of Auckland: A Field Guide. Hayward, B.W.; Auckland University Press, 2019, 335 pp. .

External links
 Pukeiti information including 1899 photo of Pukeiti (on page 24).

Auckland volcanic field
Puk
Māngere-Ōtāhuhu Local Board Area